Argentina competed in the 2020 Summer Paralympics in Tokyo, Japan from 24 August to 5 September 2021.

Medalists

Competitors
The following is the list of number of competitors participating in the Games:

Athletics 

Hernan Emanuel Urra and Yanina Martínez are among the athletes to represent Argentina at the 2020 Summer Paralympics.

Men's track

Men's field

Women's track

Women's field

Boccia 

Argentina get in BC1, BC2 & Individual BC3 events.

Cycling

Argentina sent one male cyclist after successfully getting a slot in the 2018 UCI Nations Ranking Allocation quota for the Americas.

Road

Men's road

Women's road

Track

Men's track

Women's track

Football 5-a-side

Argentina secured a qualification slot in the 2019 Americas Regional Championships after being defeated by Brazil who are already qualified by winning at the 2018 IBSA World Blind Football Championship.

Judo 

Three Argentine judoka have qualified to compete at the Games.
Men

Women

Paracanoeing 

Argentina has qualified two athletes.

Rowing

Argentina qualified one boats in the women's single sculls events for the games by winning the silver medal at the 2021 FISA Americas Qualification Regatta in Rio de Janeiro, Brazil.

Qualification Legend: FA=Final A (medal); FB=Final B (non-medal); R=Repechage

Swimming

Nine Argentina swimmer has successfully entered the paralympic slot after breaking the MQS.

Men

Women

Table tennis

Argentina entered three athletes into the table tennis competition at the games. Gabriel Copola & Mauro Depergola qualified from 2019 Parapan American Games which was held in Lima, Peru and Maria Garrone via World Ranking allocation.

Men

Women

Taekwondo

Argentina qualified one athlete to compete at the Paralympics competition. Juan Eduardo Samorano will compete at men's –75 kg class by winning the gold medal at the 2020 Americas Qualification Tournament in San José, Costa Rica.

Wheelchair tennis

Argentina qualified four players entries for wheelchair tennis. Gustavo Fernandez qualified by winning the gold medal at the 2019 Parapan American Games in Lima, Peru. Meanwhile, three other athletes qualified by world rankings.

See also
Argentina at the Paralympics
Argentina at the 2020 Summer Olympics

References

Nations at the 2020 Summer Paralympics
2021 in Argentine sport
2020